The following is a list of all team-to-team transactions that have occurred in the National Hockey League during the 2001–02 NHL season.  It lists what team each player has been traded to, signed by, or claimed by, and for which players or draft picks, if applicable.

Free agency

Note: This does not include players who have re-signed with their previous team as an Unrestricted Free Agent or as a Restricted Free Agent.

Waiver

May

June

July

August

September

October

November

December

January

February

March 1–18

March 19 - trade deadline 

National Hockey League transactions
Trans